The 1999 LPGA Championship was the 45th LPGA Championship, played June 24–27 at DuPont Country Club in Wilmington, Delaware. This was the third of four major championships that took place on the LPGA Tour in 1999.

Three days after turning 39, Juli Inkster shot a final round 65 to win her first LPGA Championship, four strokes ahead of runner-up Liselotte Neumann and completed the career grand slam. The fifth of her seven major titles, it was also consecutive major victories; she won her first U.S. Women's Open title three weeks earlier. Inkster successfully defended this LPGA Championship the following year.

The DuPont Country Club hosted this championship for 11 consecutive seasons, from 1994 through 2004.

Past champions in the field

Made the cut

Source:

Missed the cut

Source:

Final leaderboard
Sunday, June 27, 1999

Source:

References

External links
Golf Observer leaderboard

Women's PGA Championship
Golf in Delaware
LPGA Championship
LPGA Championship
LPGA Championship
LPGA Championship